Dilawar Singh Babbar now known as Dilavar Singh Jaisinghvala (18 August 1970, in Panjgrain, Punjab – 31 August 1995, in Chandigarh) was the assassin of Beant Singh, the chief minister of Indian Punjab.<ref
name=ndtv></ref> He was a serving Punjab Police officer when he joined the organization Babbar Khalsa International and became a suicide bomber to assassinate the Chief Minister of Indian Punjab.

He assassinated Beant Singh by blowing up his bullet-proof car at 5 p.m. on 31 August 1995 in the Indian Punjab and Haryana Civil Secretariat, Chandigarh.

Family

Dilawar Singh's mother, Surjit Kaur, and father, Baba Harnek Singh, live in Guru Nanak Nagar, Patiala, Punjab, India. His father was a government employee. Dilawar Singh had two brothers.

Assassination of Beant Singh 
In Punjab between 1992 and 1995, at a time when the Khalistan movement was active in the state and the Indian government was aggressively seeking to control the movement, during Beant Singh's tenure, many innocent Sikhs were killed unlawfully. As per Asian Human Rights Commission, "The Congress Government under Chief Minister Beant Singh created a situation where even subordinate police officers became the judge, jury and executioner of innocent people. Sikh boys were picked up from their houses or fields and taken blindfolded to isolated places and told to run. A burst of AK-47 rifle-fire ended their lives. Such was the terror that nobody dared ask why not even a single member of the police force was hit in crossfire. Many members of the police force in Punjab got out-of-turn promotions, gallantry awards and monetary rewards for killing “militants”." Dilawar Singh, who was a police constable at that time, conspired with Balwant Singh Rajoana, a police officer, to kill Beant Singh. The attack on 31 August 1995 resulted in the death of Beant Singh, Dilawar Singh and 17 others, and, on 25 December 1997, backup police officer Rajoana confessed his involvement while blaming the Indian government that it has murdered its own innocent people and promoted and honored the killers of Sikhs, its Chief Minister Beant Singh had licensed fake encounter killings, rape, abductions, and secret cremations which remains unpunished even today, refused to contest the court proceedings because of his lack of trust in the Indian judicial system, and death penalty was awarded to him.

Awards and afterwards 

On 23 March 2012, he was awarded with the title of "National Martyr" by the Akal Takht, the highest temporal seat of the Khalsa.

The Khalsa Action Committee (KAC), an umbrella organization of several Sikh organizations, honoured the father and mother of Dilawar Singh, Harnek Singh and Surjit Kaur with the Shaheed Baba Deep Singh gold medal at a function in the city of Amritsar. He was also given the title of 'pride of the nation' by Sikhs.

References

Further reading
Dr Harjinder Singh Dilgeer, SIKH HISTORY IN 10 VOLUMES, The Sikh University Press, Belgium, 2012.

1970 births
1995 deaths
Indian Sikhs
Khalistan movement people
Suicide bombers
Indian police officers
Suicides in India
Assassins of heads of government
Punjabi people
Suicide bombers in the Punjab insurgency